The white-winged black tyrant (Knipolegus aterrimus) is a species of bird in the family Tyrannidae. It has often included the Sao Francisco black tyrant (K. franciscanus) as a subspecies.
It is found in Argentina, Bolivia, Chile, Paraguay, Peru, and Uruguay.
Its natural habitats are subtropical or tropical moist montane forests, subtropical or tropical moist shrubland, and heavily degraded former forest.

References

External links

white-winged black tyrant
Birds of the Peruvian Andes
Birds of the Bolivian Andes
Birds of Argentina
white-winged black tyrant
Taxonomy articles created by Polbot